"Kingdom Coming", also known as "The Year of Jubilo", is an American Civil War song, written and composed by Henry C. Work in 1862, prior to the issuing of the Emancipation Proclamation by U.S. President Abraham Lincoln.

The song is pro-Unionist, and the lyrics are sung from the point of view of slaves in Confederate territory, who celebrate their impending freedom after their master flees the approach of Union military forces. They speculate on the future fate of the owner, whom they suspect will pretend to be a runaway slave in order to avoid capture. With their owner absent, the slaves revolt, locking their overseer in a cellar as retribution for his harsh treatment toward them. The slaves then celebrate their impending emancipation by Union soldiers by drinking their absent owner's cider and wine in his kitchen.

Work also wrote the song "Babylon is Fallen" ("Don't you see the black clouds risin' ober yonder") which sees the American Civil War from the perspective of the black U.S. soldiers fighting for the Union.

History
The lyrics of "Kingdom Coming" are written in plantation creole, an obsolete slave dialect that preceded African American vernacular English, and the words are now rarely sung. Instead, the tune is usually played as a lively instrumental, as in the Ken Burns documentary The Civil War. It is often heard in productions with Western or rustic settings that have nothing specifically to do with the Civil War.

Sample lyrics
Say, darkies, hab you seen de massa, wid de muffstash on his face,
Go long de road some time dis mornin', like he gwine to leab de place?
He seen a smoke way up de ribber, whar de Linkum gunboats lay;
He took his hat, and lef' berry sudden, and I spec' he's run away!

CHORUS:
De massa run, ha, ha! De darkey stay, ho, ho!
It mus' be now de kingdom coming, an' de year ob Jubilo!

He six foot one way, two foot tudder, and he weigh tree hundred pound,
His coat so big, he couldn't pay the tailor, an' it won't go halfway round.
He drill so much dey call him Cap'n, an' he got so drefful tanned,
I spec' he try an' fool dem Yankees for to tink he's contraband.

CHORUS

De darkeys feel so lonesome libbing in de loghouse on de lawn,
Dey move dar tings into massa's parlor for to keep it while he's gone.
Dar's wine an' cider in de kitchen, an' de darkeys dey'll have some;
I s'pose dey'll all be cornfiscated when de Linkum sojers come.

CHORUS

De obserseer he make us trouble, an' he dribe us round a spell;
We lock him up in de smokehouse cellar, wid de key trown in de well.
De whip is lost, de han'cuff broken, but de massa'll hab his pay;
He's ole enough, big enough, ought to known better dan to went an' run away.

In popular culture

Cartoons
The 1928 Mickey Mouse short The Gallopin' Gaucho opens and closes with music from the song. The song became the opening music for the character Pooch the Pup, starting with the 1932 cartoon The Under Dog.

"Kingdom Coming" appears in two MGM animated cartoons directed by Tex Avery, The Three Little Pups, (with Droopy) and Billy Boy, as well as in Michael Lah's Blackboard Jumble and Sheep Wrecked. The piece is whistled throughout all four pictures by a dimwitted wolf character voiced by Daws Butler (using the same slow Southern drawl he would later employ for Huckleberry Hound). This wolf character has no official name, but is commonly referred to as "Jubilo Wolf", in reference to "Year of Jubilo".

It also occasionally appears in Warner Bros. cartoons, such as being used throughout the 1938 Porky Pig cartoon Injun Trouble and its 1945 remake Wagon Heels, and the closing scenes of the 1945 Bugs Bunny cartoons The Unruly Hare and Hare Trigger.

Films
In Too Busy To Work (1932), Jubilo (Will Rogers) sings the song to his daughter Rose (Marion Nixon).

In The Telegraph Trail (1933), John Trent (John Wayne) whistles this tune. It is instrumental background music in The Horse Soldiers (1959) (also starring Wayne).

In Meet Me in St. Louis (1944), Esther Smith (Judy Garland) sings new lyrics, written for the movie, to the tune of "Year of Jubilo". The lyrics are in standard English and are inoffensive, with no reference to slavery, the Civil War, or any other controversial subject.

Books
The Year of Jubilo was the sequel to Ruth Sawyer's fictionalized autobiography Roller Skates, which won the 1937 Newbery Medal.

Other
The tune of "Kingdom Coming" was the opening theme for the NBC radio show The Chase and Sanborn Hour from 1940 to 1949.

In the late 1940s, this tune, played by a string orchestra, was used in a radio contest similar to "Name That Tune," called "Stop The Music", wherein random people were called on the phone and asked if they could name it for a substantial monetary prize. Most people could not, mistaking it for "The Old Grey Mare", which it resembles only slightly in its rhythm.

The tune was also used in the intro to the second movement of John Philip Sousa's cubaland suite. A compilation of folk songs from Spain in mvt. 1 America in mvt. 2 and Cuba in mvt. 3

Notable recordings
The McGee Brothers and Todd recorded the song with lyrics in 1927 as "Old Master's Runaway"
Frank Crumit recorded "Kingdom Coming and the Year of Jubilo" on November 29, 1927. It was released on Victor 21108.
Sauter-Finegan Orchestra recorded an instrumental version titled "Doodletown Fifers", which they released as their first record,  and it reached No. 12 on the Billboard chart in 1952.  "Doodletown Fifers" has also been recorded by the Boston Pops Orchestra.
Western pop singer "Tennessee" Ernie Ford had a hit record in 1958 titled "Sunday Barbecue", which became the latest incarnation of the original tune. It was released on Capitol # F3997.
The Holy Modal Rounders recorded the song in 1978 as "Year of Jubilo."
The Red Clay Ramblers recorded the song in 1975 on their album "Stolen Love" (Flying Fish FF109).
A solo piano rendition of the song is included on jazz pianist Bill Carrothers' album, The Blues and the Greys, which features popular music from the time of the Civil War.
The song appears on the soundtrack to Ken Burns' Civil War, usually played whenever pictures of General Ulysses S. Grant are shown on screen.
The song is performed by Pokey LaFarge in the 2013 collection Divided and United: The Songs of the Civil War, titled as "Kingdom Come."

External links
One of many websites with lyrics
Original lyrics and MIDI music
Sheet music for "Kingdom Coming", from Project Gutenberg

References 

Songs of the American Civil War
African Americans in the American Civil War
Songs written by Henry Clay Work
1862 songs